Ziarat (also Romanized as Zīārat, Zeyārat, and Zīyārat) is a city in Ziarat Rural District, in the Central District of Shirvan County, North Khorasan Province, Iran. At the 2006 census, its population was 4,202, in 1,013 families.

References 

Populated places in Shirvan County
Cities in North Khorasan Province